Assiniboia West was a federal electoral district in the Northwest Territories, Canada, that was represented in the House of Commons of Canada from 1896 to 1908.

This riding was created in 1886. When the provinces of Alberta and Saskatchewan were created in 1905, this district, with territory in both new provinces, continued to represent them until it was abolished in 1907. It was redistributed into Battleford, Medicine Hat, Moose Jaw, Regina and Saskatoon ridings.

Election results

N.B. Mr. Davin elected by the casting vote of the Returning Officer

By-election: On Mr. Scott's resignation to enter provincial politics in Saskatchewan, 29 August 1905.

See also 

 List of Canadian federal electoral districts
 Past Canadian electoral districts

Successor districts 

Battleford
Medicine Hat
Moose Jaw
Regina
Saskatoon

External links 
 
 
 

Former federal electoral districts of Northwest Territories
Former federal electoral districts of Alberta
Former federal electoral districts of Saskatchewan